Tonightly is a British comedy entertainment show presented by comedian Jason Manford. It was part of the Generation Next project on Channel 4 and was shown late evening, every weekday. The series concluded on 22 August 2008. The TNT Show, hosted by Jack Whitehall, was essentially a revamped second series of Tonightly.

The show
Tonightly featured a variety of new comic performers, providing a daily dose of satirical news, comment and all-round silliness.

Production
Each episode was recorded 2–5 hours before broadcast to ensure the news and discussions were up to date. It was filmed in Studio 3 at The London Studios.

External links

2000s British comedy television series
2008 British television series debuts
2008 British television series endings
Channel 4 comedy
Television series by All3Media